Stephen Lynch fitz Arthur, Mayor of Galway 1546-47.

Lynch was the son of Arthur Lynch, Mayor in 1507. He enacted a statute the warden and vicars of the town should not set any lands or revenues of the collegiate church for over one year, apparently because longer tenures were being given to friends and relatives, which caused problems for the church. Three Lynch Mayors bearing the patroyomic fitz Stephen were elected mayor in 1552 and 1554 and 1603, but only the last, Marcus Lynch fitz Stephen, may have been his son.

See also

 Mayor of Galway
 The Tribes of Galway

References
History of Galway, James Hardiman, Galway, 1820.
Old Galway, Maureen Donovan O'Sullivan, 1942.
Henry, William (2002). Role of Honour: The Mayors of Galway City 1485-2001. Galway: Galway City Council.  
 Martyn, Adrian (2016). The Tribes of Galway: 1124-1642

Politicians from County Galway
Mayors of Galway
Year of death unknown
Year of birth unknown
16th-century Irish businesspeople